Ukilla (Quechua for a medical plant whose seed is used to dye, Hispanicized spelling Uquilla) is a  volcano in the Bolivian Andes. It is situated in the Potosí Department, Nor Lípez Province, Quemes Municipality. Ukilla lies south of the Uyuni salt flat in a volcanic field known as Pampa Luxsar.

References 

Volcanoes of Potosí Department